Alelimma is a genus of moths of the family Erebidae. The genus was erected by George Hampson in 1895.

Species
Alelimma apicalis (Hampson, 1895) Myanmar
Alelimma ochreofusca Holloway, 2008 Borneo, Philippines
Alelimma pallicostalis Hampson, 1902 southern Africa
Alelimma pallidifusca Hampson, 1895 north-eastern Himalayas, Thailand, Peninsular Malaysia, Borneo, Sangihe, Sulawesi
Alelimma zema Strand, 1920 Taiwan
Alelimma zemsella Strand, 1920 Taiwan

References

Noctuidae
Noctuoidea genera